Atpadi is an administrative town of the Atpadi Taluka of Sangli District in the Indian state of Maharashtra. Atpadi is located north-east of Sangli District and shares borders with the adjacent Solapur and Satara Districts. The town has a taluka administrative office (that is, a Panchayat samiti local government body), a courthouse, a police station, a government-run primary hospital, various schools and colleges and a theater. Atpadi's economy is based on the cultivation and sale of agricultural products, with pomegranates and cotton constituting the core of the industry. The town is also home to the Manganga Sahakari Sugar factory, a Pomegranate auction center and various small scale industries in fields such as manufacturing, processing, servicing and repairs.

The town can also lay claim to a literary connection, with four prominent Marathi authors originating from Atpadi.

History
The history of Atpadi before the 15th/16th century is not documented. Some editions of the Stahala Purana mention the town Atpade (अटपडे), but the date of the writing is undocumented. In historic times, Atpadi was part of the Manank yadav kingdom of Mandesh, ruled from the nearby village of Devapur. In the 16th century Atapdi was part of the Adilshahi kingdom of Bijapur. Later in the 19th century it became part of the princely state of Aundh as well as a palace city, hence it was called Atpadi Mahal. After Indian independence and the merging of Aundh into the Republic of India, Atpadi was in Khanapur Taluka in the Satara district till the new district Sangli was formed. After the formation of the new district, Atpadi was separated from Khanapur Taluka and made an administrative division (Taluka). Prominent Marathi writers like the late G.D.Madgulkar (गदिमा), the late Vyankatesh Madgulkar, the late Shankar Rao Kharat, the late N.S. Inamdar, the late Arun Kamble and the former petroleum minister of India, Ram Naik were from Atpadi.

Geography

Town
Atpadi is located at Latitude: 17° 25' 0 N, Longitude: 74° 57' 0 E with a population of approximately 25000. The only language used in the town is Marathi.  The northern area of Atpadi has government administration office, a Government Hospital, Courthouse, Police station, Electricity Board office, colleges and  newly formed colonies. Major developments of the new Atpadi area is on the north side of town while the south side of town is old and more populated. the southern part serves as a commercial center and as the downtown area of Atpadi. It has the MSRTC bus stand, and the old government hospital. The old Atpadi town has a market place for the weekly bazaar (vegetable, fruit, cattle market), a designated road for shops known as Peth. The residential areas in old town is dominated by families from the caste/with the surname Galli.
Different galis are named as Wani Galli, Brahman Galli, Navhi Galli, Kosthi Galli, Kasar Galli, Deshmukh Galli, Kumbhar Galli, Parit Galli. Other newly formed residential colonies are Choundeshwari colony, Vidya Nagar, Sathe Nagar, Phule Nagar, Vithal Sampat nagar.

Surrounding area and villages
Atpadi is surrounded by small farming hamlets from all directions of town known as 'Waadi'. These places hold houses of farmers further grouped into communities. They lack commercial markets or higher education schools. The surrounding areas depend on the Atpadi town for trading agricultural produce and for education. Their proximity to the town area, the expansion of the town with a growing population, infrastructural needs and well connected roads are making surrounding areas become part of the town.
Bhingewadi: Bhingewadi is a small Grampanchat Village located 3 kilometers to the north-west of the Atpadi Town. Bhingewadi is populated mostly by farmers whose surname is Bhinge, thus the name Bhingewadi. Bhingewadi is a small village of 2000 people with much farmland. Wheat, Jowar, Bajara, and pomegranate are the main produce from the farmlands. It is adjacent to Swatantrapur.
Bombewadi: Located on the East Side of Atpadi City 
Awalai: Situated in between Dinghachi village and Atpadi slightly near to village Nimbawade.
Deshmukhwaadi: Situated to the east of Atpadi
Yamaji Patalachi Wadi: Located on the Atpadi-Sangola road
Mapate Mala: Located on the Atpad-Nimbawade road to the north-west
Sonarsiddhnagar: Located on the Atpadi-Kouthuli road. It has the industrial colony of Manganga Sugar Factory.
Kouthuli: Located near Manganga river and Manganga Sugar Factory.
Swatantrapur: Located between Atpadi lake and Bhingewadi. It is a free custodian colony built in 1939. The Hindi cinema, 'Do ankhe baraah haath' is based in Swatantrapur.
Location of Atpadi with respect to surrounding area and other major towns.
Nimbavade: located between Atpadi and Zare
Anusewadi: located between Atpadi and Nimbavade. The way goes from Atpadi Police Station to Nimbavade through crossing the small village Anusewadi. The large shepherd community in this village tend flocks of sheep and goats.

Season
Summer, monsoon rain and winter are the main three seasons year-round. The region falls under the rain-shadow area resulting in less rain.

Water resources
The only source for drinking water in Atpadi is a lake which is located 3 km away from town.
The Shuk Odha (stream) and Manganga River are near to Atpadi. Generally both of them are active only during the monsoon season. Various water canals were projected into the Atpadi Taluka under Khrishna Khore Vikas Mahamandal's scheme named Tembhu.

Forest area
Atpadi has a forest office near Swatantrapur. Dubai Kuran (डबई कुरण) is a reserved forest area. It has a plantation of Babool trees. Initially this area was created as grazing ground for cattle in summer time. Cattle grazing is no longer allowed as it is a reserved forest area. Wild animals like wolf, jackal, porcupine, fox, Asian palm civet and wild hares can be seen here.

Political and judiciary system
The Atpadi town has a gram panchayat for the administration of the town. In election which was held in May 2018 Vrushali Patil was elected by people as a sarpanch for next five years who is wife of famous personality of Atpadi taluka ADV. Dhananjay Patil. She is owner of Sharadha medicals.  while the Panchayat Samiti is to administer the entire Taluka.
Atpadi is part of the Atpadi-Khanapur constituency of Vidhan Sabha and the Maharashtra State Sangli constituency of Loksabha. The Atpadi Magistrate's Court oversees criminal proceedings while the Civil Court is presided over by the Junior Division of the court. The Atpadi Police station maintains law and order.
The old building of Atpadi Grampanchayat was renovated though the original design of the building remained unchanged.

Late Annasaheb Lengare was the elected MLA from Atpadi-Kavathemhankal Constituency. When Atpadi was separated from Kavathemhankal and joined to Khanapur then after in 1995 Rajendra Deshmukh was elected as a MLA from Atpadi-Khanapur constituency. Nowdays Gopichand Padalkar is a member of Maharashtra Legislative Council. He got elected to the Legislative Council by MLA's (unopposed) on 14 May 2020.

Industry
Atpadi's industry is based on agriculture and dairy products as well as secondary industries. Industries are located around the Atpadi town. Industries have created jobs and business for people living around Atpadi. The sugar factory is the largest of all industries in Atpadi. A program called Khadi gramodyog was started by the Government of India to promote rural employment for woman.
Sugar Factory: Manganga Sugar Factory
Cotton Mill: Babasaheb Deshmukh Shetkari Sahakari Sutgirani
Dairy milk: Packaged milk under the brand "Family No. 1" (previously 'Sakaal')
Domestic industry of woolen blankets 
Khadi Gramodyog

Travel and entertainment
Atpadi is connected by road and falls on the state highway between Solapur and Karad. It can be accessed from Solapur, Sangli, Kolhapur, Karad, Pune and Mumbai and adjacent towns through state transport buses as well as private buses. Atpadi has a  MSRTC bus stand and depot. The MSRTC bus is a preferred mode of transport by most people. Atpadi has a few lodges and a number of hotels and road-side joints. Siddhanath Chitrmandir is the only functioning cinema/theater, offering Marathi and Hindi movies. Shreeram Talkies, a pavilion based cinema screen became defunct in the 1990s.

What to see

Swatantrapur: Free custodian colony
Atpadi Lake (Atpadi Pazar Talav / Atpadi Tale)
Rajewadi talav
Sonarshiddh Temple
Siddhnath temple, Kharsundi
Ram Mandir, Karagani
Kalleshwar Madhir & Uttreshwar mandhir, Atpadi
Shukachari Hills in Hivtad: Place of ancient sage Shukmuni (Śuka), son of Vyas

Jakai Devi Mandir near Manewadi - Beautiful temple surrounded by hills and situated near lake
Bhupalgad

Education
Atpadi has schools and colleges. Bachelor's degrees are offered in Science, Arts, Commerce, Education and Engineering.
Colleges:Shrimant Babasaheb Deshmukh Mahavidyalaya Atpadi.
Atpadi (Arts, Science and Commerce),
Kala Vidnyan Mahavidyalaya affiliated to Shivaji University, Kolhapur.
Abasaheb Khebudkar Junior college of science, Atpadi
Schools :
Shree Bhavani High School, Atpadi
S.V.D.D. Girl's High School, Atpadi
Rajaram Bapu Highschool, Atpadi. All high schools are affiliated to the SSC/HSC board, Kolhapur.

Professional courses:
Industrial Training Institute, Atpadi (ITI college); Various D.Ed. Colleges and Agriculture Diploma College, Bhingewadi.
Sriram society's Engineering and Diploma college
D.Ed and B.Ed college
A.k.jr college of science, atpadi

Medical Service 
Government Primary Hospital is major medical facility in Atpadi, supported by various private clinics, hospitals and laboratories.

Art and culture

Literature
Atpadi has produced four presidents of Marathi Sahitya Sammelan. The author and poet, Adhunik Walmiki, popularly known as GaDiMa (गदिमा) and G. D. Madgulkar are from the nearby village, Madgule. His younger brother, Venkatesh Madgulkar as well as Shankar Rao Kharat and N. S. Inamdar are three other authors from Atpadi. The late Prof. Arun Kamble, a prominent Marathi writer, was born in Atpadi Taluka. The Marathi book, 'Mandeshi Manase' (People of Mandesh), written by Venkatesh Madgulkar, is based on characters in Atpadi and is set in Atpadi and its surrounding areas. The autobiography of Shankar Rao Kharat Taral-Antaral has a detailed chapter on Atpadi before the independence of India.
MaanDarshan: A magazine published from Atpadi.
Vyatha Pinjryatil Pakhranchya: Kavi Shriram Anuse who is the Mandeshi poet.
Punha Ek Navi Disha: Author Nitinraje Anuse whose full name is Nitin Machhindra Anuse.

Folk dance, songs and sports
Folk dance and songs, known as 'Gaji' and 'Dhangari Owi' respectively, are hallmarks of the Maandesh culture. Rural sports like soil wrestling and Kabaddi are held annually at various annual fairs. Modern sports like cricket and volleyball are other popular sports.
Namdev Wadare, a Shivchhatrapati State award-winning wrestler started a wrestling institute in Atpadi where the western style of wrestling is taught.

Agriculture and cattle
Agriculture: Jowar, maize, wheat, cotton, sugarcane, bajari and pomegranate are the main agricultural produce in Atpadi. Pomegranate plantations are quite new and modern irrigation techniques, like drip irrigation, have helped local farmers to grow pomegranate fields. Being an export product to Middle-East and Arab nations, pomegranate has given higher yields to farmers than traditional crop-based farming. The low monsoon rainfall is advantageous to farmers as the pomegranate is a desert tree.
Khillari bull (Atpadi Mahal)- The breed is well adapted to the tropical and drought prone conditions present in this part of the world and are favoured by the local farming community due to their ability to handle the hardships of farming pretty well.
Buffalo, sheep and goat are also raised.

Temples and festivals
The Atpadi town as well as the Atpadi Taluka has various temples. Uttareshwar is a patron god of the Atpadi town and a 15‑day fair is held in Atpadi for Uttareshwar. The pulling of a wooden chariot by men is one of the rituals of the fair. Kharsundi, a place in the Atpadi Taluka, is the highest seat of Lord Siddhanath. Apart from the Hindu temples, Atpadi has a Mosque. Atpadi has a unique temple dedicated to Yoga and suryanamaskar called 'Suryopasana Mandir', though this is not a religious place. Suryopasana Mandir serves as a community hall for people who wish to practice yoga and exercise suryanamaskar.

 List of temples in Atpadi

Nath Baba (Bhingewadi Road)
Jotiba (Bhingewadi Road)
Sai Mandir (Bhingewadi Road)
 AAI Saheb mandir ( wife of Saint Gondavalekar maharaj)- (Brahmin Galli)
Vitthal Mandir (Near ST Stand)
Kalleshwar (Center)
Vitthal Mandir (Near the Post Office)
Ram mandir (Brahman Galli)
Datta mandir (Brahman Galli)
Ramnath Buwa mandir (Peth)
Uttareshwar (bajar Patangan, Patron god of Atpadi.
Kala Maruti (bajar Patangan)
Khandoba (bajar Patangan)
Yellama (bajar Patangan)
Math (Wani Galli)
Laandaa Maruti (Prakashwadi)
Tambada Maruti (Deshmukh Galli)
Vetal (Prakashwadi)
Parmeshwar Mandir (Shukra Odha)
Sonarsiddha Mandir (Sonarsiddhwadi)
Narsoba Mandir located at various places in town. (Five in all)
Ganesh Mandir (Ambabai Odha)
Ambabai mandir (Ambabai Odha)
Tulajapurche Thanake (Karkhana Road)
Choundeshwari Mandir
26. Mayakka Mandir (Sathe chowk)

List of other temples from Atpadi taluka

Siddhanath Mandir – Kharsundi, Seat of Lord Siddhanath, Avtar of Lord Shiva
Biroba Mandir  – Anusewadi
Duloba Mandir  – Nimbavade
Lakhmeshwar (Shivaling worshipped by Lakshman, Brother of Shriram during RAMAYAN period, that's why known as Lakhmeshwar) And Shriram Mandir – Karagani
Shukachari Cave – Shukachari
JakaiDevi Mandir – Nelkaranji, Place of the wife of Lord Siddhanath
Jotiba Mandir – Madgule
Khandoba Mandir – Madgule
Marimata Mandir – Avalai
Siddhanath Mandir – Shetphale
Bhaktabai Mandir – Shetphale
Jogeshwari Mandir – Shetphale.
Masoba Mandir  – Banpuri
BhavaniTemple – Dighanchi
Hanuman Mandir – Pimpri Budruk
sidhatnath Mandir- Pimpri Budruk, believed to be a place for curing snake bites
Jotirling Mandir – Tadawale
Ganesh Mandir - (Patrewadi) 14 May
Vithoba Mandir Balewadi (Yamgarvasti)
Hanuman Mandir Balewadi

Festivals
Diwali, the main festival of Hindus, other festivals like Ganesh Chaturthi and the Muslim festival, Muharram, are celebrated publicly. Apart from religious festivals, a town fair devoted to the patron god of Atpadi, Uttareshwar, is held after Diwali for 3 days.
Uttareshwar jatra – Atpadi. Major fair of the area starting from Kartik Pornima and lasting the next 15 days.
Gnyaneshwer Parayan Sohala-Tadavale 2 May per year

Akhand Harinam Saptha (Jotiba Mandir) – Madgule. Held every April
Paravarcha Melava (G. D. Madgulkar Janma divas 1 October) - Shetphale.
Ashtami Yatra – Shetphale. Chaitra Vadya Ashtami
Khandoba Jatra – Madgule
Yallama devi yatra, Jotiba yatra - GOMEWADI
Marimi Aai Yatra – Tadawale
Marimata Jatra – Avalai
Paush yatra – Kharsundi. This festival is famous for its khillari cattle trade in Maharashtra, Karnataka and Andhra.
Chaitra yatra – Kharsundi (Saasan/Shaasan Kaathi)
Jakai yatra – Nelkaranji
Masoba Jatra – Banpuri. This festival starts from Shalivahan Shak, the Hindu new year (Gudhipadava), and lasts for 5 days.
Hanuman Jatra Festival – Pimpri Budruk
Hanuman Sidhanath jatra at Shuknagar. (Hivtad)
Hari nam saptaha Balewadi
Mahalakshmi Temple Bombewadi

Other villages in Atpadi Taluka
Complete List of grampanchat villages in Atpadi taluka can be found here.

Distance from major cities
Sangli - 90 km
Kolhapur - 135 km
Pune - 240 km
Hyderabad - 450 km
Solapur - 120 km
Pandharpur - 60 km
Karad - 100 km
Satara - 120 km
Mumbai-400 km
Nagpur-777 km

References

External links
Sriram society's Engineering and Diploma college
Atpadi Education Society
Maharashtra Pomegranate Growers research Association

Talukas in Maharashtra
Villages in Sangli district